Virtue is the surname of:

Brock Virtue (born 1986), Canadian curler
Erin Virtue, American volleyball coach
George Virtue (died 1868), London publisher
Jake Virtue (1865–1943), American Major League Baseball player
James Sprent Virtue (1829–1892), British publisher, son of George Virtue
John Virtue (born 1947), English artist
Keith Virtue (1909–1980), Australian pioneer aviator
Mickey Virtue, member of the British reggae/pop band UB40
Tarita Virtue (born 1970), successful actress and model
Tessa Virtue (born 1989), Canadian ice dancer, 3 Olympic gold medals and 2 Olympic silver medals
Tom Virtue (born 1957), American actor

See also
 Vertue